Friars Hole Cave System is a cave in West Virginia's Greenbrier and Pocahontas counties. First surveyed in the 1960s, it is one of the longest in the United States and the world.

Various sources put its total length at 63 km, 73.4 km, 72 km, to 77.4 km long. The West Virginia Encyclopedia says that 44 miles of the cave have been surveyed, making it the longest cave in the state, the 6th-longest cave in the United States, and the 17th-longest cave in the world. In 2017, William B. White called it is the 31st-longest cave in the world.

The cave has ten entrances, five of which are closed: Friars Hole, Rubber Chicken, Crookshank Pit, Toothpick, Snedegars caves entrances (Snedegars Staircase, Snedegars Saltpeter, Snedegars Stream, Snedegars North), and Canadian Hole, Radio Pit.

The cave formed in the Mississippian Greenbrier group. The oldest passage to the cave is said to 4.1 million years old. The cave was formed by streams sinking down into the ground. The minor structures in the cave were influenced by thrust faults.

References

External links
 
 
Caves of West Virginia
Greenbrier County, West Virginia
Pocahontas County, West Virginia